Triffyn son of Rhain (died c. 814) was an 8th- and 9th-century king of Dyfed.

He was the son of Rhain ap Maredudd. On the death of his father, Triffyn did not succeed himinstead, his uncle Owain did. After Triffyn succeeded Owain, nothing is known about the realm of Dyfed before Hyfaidd went to Alfred the Great in the 880s to request help opposing Rhodri the Great's younger son Cadell. It's possible the kingdomcrushed by Coenwulf of Mercia around 818fell under the control of the Vikings.

Traditional genealogies report that from Triffyn descends, in the male-line, Cadifor ap Collwyn (aka Cedifor/Cadivor ap Gollwyn/Colhoyn), a Lord of Dyfed within Rhys ap Tewdwr's Deheubarth. When Cadifor died, his sons revolted against Rhys, which destabilised his kingdom, setting the scene for the Norman Conquest of South Wales; legends reported in the 16th century (e.g. by John Leland) claim that Cadifor had a brother - Einion ap Collwyn, who was instrumental in the Norman Conquest of Glamorgan.

References

814 deaths
8th-century Welsh monarchs
Monarchs of Dyfed
9th-century Welsh monarchs
Year of birth unknown